The Yasuda Kinen (English: Yasuda Memorial, Japanese and Chinese language: 安田記念) is a Japanese International Grade I Thoroughbred horse race held at the Tokyo Racecourse in Tokyo. Raced annually each June, the Yasuda Kinen is run at a distance of eight furlongs (one mile) on turf and is open to horses three years of age and up. The event was first run in 1951 as the Yasuda Sho in honor of Izaemon Yasuda, the founding chairman of the Japan Racing Association. Following the death of Mr. Yasuda, in 1958 the race name was changed to the Yasuda Kinen.

In 1984 the race was promoted to Grade 1 status and in 1993 it was granted International Grade 1 status. In 2005, the race became the final leg of the Asian Mile Challenge. In addition to the US$1 million first place purse, another US$1 million bonus is given to any horse who wins two legs of the four-race Asian Mile Challenge.

Past winners of the Yasuda Kinen include Oguri Cap and  Taiki Shuttle, both Horse of the Year honorees in Japan in 1990 and 1998 respectively. As well, the race has been won by international horses such as the Godolphin 1995 winner Heart Lake, and Fairy King Prawn who in 2000 became the first Hong Kong-trained horse to ever win a Grade I race outside of Hong Kong. In 2006 another Hong Kong-owned champion, Bullish Luck, won the race and earned the Asian Mile Challenge bonus money for winning both the Yasuda Kinen and the Champions Mile in Hong Kong.

Winners since 1984

Earlier winners 

 1951 - Issei
 1952 - Swee Sue
 1953 - Swee Sue
 1954 - Fuso
 1955 - Kuri Chikara
 1956 - Yoshifusa
 1957 - Hekiraku
 1958 - Rhapsody
 1959 - Hishi Masaru
 1960 - Onward Bell
 1961 - Homareboshi
 1962 - Tokon
 1963 - Yamano O
 1964 - Shimofusa Homare
 1965 - Panasonic
 1966 - Hishi Masahide
 1967 - Buchan
 1968 - Shesquay
 1969 - Hard Way
 1970 - Mejiro Asama
 1971 - Harbor Game
 1972 - Rafale
 1973 - Haku Hosho
 1974 - Kyoei Green
 1975 - Sakura Iwai
 1976 - Nishiki Ace
 1977 - Squash Tholon
 1978 - Nippo King
 1979 - Royal Shinzan
 1980 - Blue Hallez
 1981 - Takeden
 1982 - Sweet Native
 1983 - Kiyo Hidaka

See also
 Horse racing in Japan
 List of Japanese flat horse races

References 
Racing Post: 

External links 
 Horse Racing in Japan

Open mile category horse races
Horse races in Japan
Turf races in Japan